Kabuliwallah ("person from Kabul") may refer to:
 Pashtun diaspora in India Swapnil Padvi
 "Kabuliwala" (short story), an 1892 short story by Rabindranath Tagore
Kabuliwala (1957 film), a 1957 Indian Bengali film
 Kabuliwala (1961 film), a 1961 Indian Hindi film
Kabuliwala (2006 film), a Bangladeshi film
Kabuliwala, part of the television series Stories by Rabindranath Tagore
 Kabooliwala, a 1993 Malayalam comedy drama film